Treo may refer to:

 Gillette Treo, a razor designed for caregivers to shave seniors and people with disabilities
 Jeep Treo, a 2003 electric concept car
 Palm Treo, a line of smartphones
 Treo (dog), recipient of the Dickin Medal
 Treo (drug), a painkiller

See also
Trio (disambiguation)